Appeal to accomplishment is a genetic fallacy wherein Person A challenges a thesis put forward by Person B because Person B has not accomplished similar feats or accomplished as many feats as Person C or Person A. 

The reverse, appealing to the fact that no one has the proper experience in question and thus cannot prove something is impossible, is a version of an argument from silence.

Appeal to accomplishment is a form of appeal to authority, which is a well-known logical fallacy. Some consider that it can be used in a cogent form when all sides of a discussion agree on the reliability of the authority in the given context.

Examples
"How dare you criticize the prime minister? What do you know about running an entire country?"
"I'll take your opinions on music seriously when you've released a record that went platinum."
"Get back to me when you've built up a multi-billion dollar empire of your own. Until then, shut up."
"If you think you know so much about making a video game, make one yourself!"

References

Genetic fallacies